USA Rugby South is an organization that combines a number of unions in the south-east of the USA for competition and representative honours. Their representative team is known as the Panthers.

Originally formed as Southern Eastern Rugby Union in 1976, this representative team played against the North Eastern Rugby Union between 1976 and 1982.

USA Rugby South organizes inter-union competitions between champion teams from each geographical union, who go on to represent USA Rugby South at national competitions.

Since 2013, the USA Rugby South Panthers have competed in the NACRA Rugby Championship and were crowned champions in their first year, beating Trinidad and Tobago in the final.

There are currently seven member organisations associated with USA Rugby South.

Squad
USA Rugby South squad for an exhibition game against Old Glory DC in June 2019.

References

External links
Official site

South
1976 establishments in the United States